São Vicente Ferrer is a Brazilian municipality in the state of Pernambuco. According with IBGE in 2020, has an estimated population of 18,085 inhabitants.

Geography

 State - Pernambuco
 Region - Agreste of Pernambuco
 Boundaries - Macaparana  (N), Machados   (S)   Vicência  (E);  Orobó and Paraiba state  (W).
 Area - 110.49 km2
 Elevation - 419 m
 Hydrography - Goiana River
 Vegetation - Subcaducifólia forest
 Annual average temperature - 23.1 °C
 Distance to Recife - 131 km

Economy

The main economic activities in São Vicente Ferrer are related with commerce and agribusiness, especially creations of cattle; and plantations of bananas, grapes and sugarcane.

Economic Indicators

Economy by Sector
2006

Health Indicators

References

Municipalities in Pernambuco